Rzeszotary may refer to the following places in Poland:
Rzeszotary, Lower Silesian Voivodeship (south-west Poland)
Rzeszotary, Lesser Poland Voivodeship (south Poland)